Pacific Theatres' Cinerama Dome is a movie theater located at 6360 Sunset Boulevard in Hollywood, California. Designed to exhibit widescreen Cinerama films, it opened November 7, 1963. The original developer was William R. Forman, founder of Pacific Theatres. The Cinerama dome continued as a leading first-run theater, most recently as part of the ArcLight Hollywood complex, until it closed temporarily in March 2020, due to the COVID-19 pandemic in California. The Arclight chain closed permanently in April 2021, with the theater never having reopened. In June 2022, it was announced that there are plans to reopen under the new name, Cinerama Hollywood.

History 
In February 1963, Cinerama Inc. unveiled a radically new design for theaters that would show its movies. They would be based on the geodesic dome developed by R. Buckminster Fuller, would cost half as much as conventional theaters of comparable size, and could be built in half the time. Cinerama's goal was to see at least 600 built worldwide within two years. The following April, Pacific Theatres Inc. announced plans to build the first theater based upon the design, and had begun razing existing buildings at the construction site. Located on Sunset near Vine Street, it would be the first new major motion picture theater in Hollywood in 33 years, and would be completed in time for the scheduled November 2 press premiere of It's a Mad, Mad, Mad, Mad World. The design was proposed by French architect Pierre Cabrol, lead designer in the noted architectural firm of Welton Becket and Associates. Pierre Cabrol worked with R. Buckminster Fuller during his studies at MIT.

Pacific Theatres founder, William R. Forman, announced the construction of the Cinerama Dome in July 1963 at a star studded ground breaking ceremony where Spencer Tracy, Buddy Hackett, Mickey Rooney, Dick Shawn, Edie Adams, and Dorothy Provine donned hard hats, and with picks and shovels, began construction. Forman had committed to United Artists that the theatre would be ready for the November 7, 1963 world premiere of the first movie filmed in the new 70mm, single strip Cinerama process, Stanley Kramer’s It’s a Mad, Mad, Mad, Mad, World. Working around the clock, the entire construction spanned only 16 weeks. The Cinerama Dome is the only concrete geodesic dome in the world. The theatre is made up of 316 individual hexagonal and pentagonal shapes in 16 different sizes.

The It's a Mad, Mad, Mad, Mad World premiere (filmed in Ultra Panavision 70) marked the dawn of "single lens" Cinerama. Previously, Cinerama was known for its groundbreaking three-projector process. From 1963 until 2002, the Cinerama Dome never showed movies with the three-projector process. (The nearby Warner Cinerama at 6433 Hollywood Boulevard used the three-projector process until December 1964.) A unique "rectified" print was made with increased anamorphic compression towards the sides, which compensated for distortions that would otherwise be induced by Cinerama's deeply curved screen.

21st Century 
In 2002 after a two-year closure, the Cinerama Dome was reopened as a part of Pacific Theatres' ArcLight Hollywood complex. The dome remains essentially unchanged though there have been improvements, notably in the acoustics. But for the first time ever, the Cinerama Dome began showing movies in the three-projector format. It is one of only three such theaters in the world.

The Cinerama Dome made its digital projection debut in May 2005 with Star Wars: Episode III – Revenge of the Sith. In 2009, James Cameron's Avatar was the first 3D film to be shown in the Cinerama Dome, using technology from XpanD 3D.

In December 2015, the Cinerama Dome upgraded to a laser projection system, using two Christie 6P projectors and Dolby 3D. The venue is still capable of both 35mm and 70mm film projection.

In April 2021, the parent company of Pacific Theatres announced that it would not be reopening any of its locations including the Cinerama Dome due to the impact of the COVID-19 pandemic.

In June 2022, it was reported that Decurion Corp. has plans to reopen the theater under the name Cinerama Hollywood along with the adjoining 14-screen multiplex. There are also plans to include two bars and a restaurant at the location. Three months later, it was reported that the theater would not be reopening until at least the latter part of 2023.

Preservation 
But by the late 1990s the motion picture exhibition business began to favor multiplex cinemas, and Pacific Theatres proposed a plan to remodel the Dome as a part of a shopping mall/cinema complex. Historical preservationists were outraged, not wishing to see another great theater turned into a multiplex or destroyed. At the same time, a small contingent of Cinerama enthusiasts had begun resurrecting the three-projector process. They and the preservationists prevailed upon Pacific to rethink its plans for the property.

The preservation of the Cinerama Dome came at a time when most other surviving Cinerama theaters were being demolished. An example of this was the case of the Indian Hills Theater in Omaha, Nebraska, a round Cinerama theater boasting a 110-foot screen that was razed in 2001 to make room for a parking lot.

The Cinerama Dome was declared a Los Angeles Historic-Cultural Monument in 1998.

In popular culture 
One of the earliest appearances of the Cinerama Dome was in the 1968 B movie crime drama Girl in Gold Boots during a montage of the main characters arriving in Los Angeles. (The movie was later shown as a feature presentation in a 1999 episode of the comedy series Mystery Science Theater 3000.)

The Cinerama Dome appears in the 1977 film Hollywood High.  It is screening Logan's Run.

The Cinerama Dome is shown being destroyed by the Cylons in the TV series Galactica 1980.

The Cinerama Dome was featured in the 2008 film Frost/Nixon directed by Ron Howard in the scene recreating the Hollywood premiere of the Sherman Brothers' 1976 musical film, The Slipper and the Rose.

The Cinerama Dome appeared in Season 1 Episode 4 of Entourage as the premier theater for "Head On", Vincent Chase's first feature film.

It was also shown in Melrose Place's fourth episode, "Vine", as the location for the premiere of the fictional movie "Kensington Squared."

The theater also appears briefly in the 2016 film Keanu, starring Keegan-Michael Key and Jordan Peele.

The Cinerama Dome appears in Quentin Tarantino's 2019 film Once Upon a Time in Hollywood, shown screening Krakatoa, East of Java in 1969. The Krakatoa posters used during filming remained on the theater for the film's 70mm engagement there.

See also
 List of Los Angeles Historic-Cultural Monuments in Hollywood
 Seattle Cinerama
 Pictureville Cinema

References

External links

Cinerama
ArcLight Cinemas
Pacific Theatres
 

Cinemas and movie theaters in Hollywood, Los Angeles
Cinerama venues
Domes
Theatres completed in 1963
Geodesic domes
Los Angeles Historic-Cultural Monuments
1963 establishments in California
Googie architecture in California
Modernist architecture in California
Welton Becket buildings